Halls Summit is an unincorporated community in Coffey County, Kansas, United States.

History
Halls Summit had a post office from 1878 until 1935. Since 2003, it has been the home of NOAA Weather Radio transmitter, KGG-98, operated by the National Weather Service Topeka, Kansas to serve residents of east-central and southeast Kansas.

Notable people
 Alan L. Hart (1890-1962), physician and tuberculosis researcher, born in Halls Summit

References

Further reading

External links
 Coffey County maps: Current, Historic, KDOT

Unincorporated communities in Coffey County, Kansas
Unincorporated communities in Kansas